The Holland Jenks House (also known as the Stuart Jenks House) is a historic home located in Auburndale, Florida, United States.

Description and history 
The house was completed by the fall of 1925.

On March 7, 1996, it was added to the U.S. National Register of Historic Places.

References

External links
 Polk County listings at National Register of Historic Places

Houses on the National Register of Historic Places in Florida
National Register of Historic Places in Polk County, Florida
Houses in Polk County, Florida
Auburndale, Florida
Houses completed in 1925
1925 establishments in Florida